Amphidromus elvinae is a species of air-breathing land snail in the family Camaenidae.

Distribution 
This species is found in South Bengkulu, South of Sumatra Island, Indonesia.

References 

elvinae
Gastropods described in 2007